Atacamite is a copper halide mineral: a copper(II) chloride hydroxide with formula Cu2Cl(OH)3. It was first described for deposits in the Atacama Desert of Chile in 1802 by Dmitri de Gallitzin. The Atacama Desert is also the namesake of the mineral.

Occurrence 
Atacamite is polymorphous with botallackite, clinoatacamite, and paratacamite. Atacamite is a comparatively rare mineral, formed from primary copper minerals in the oxidation or weathering zone of arid climates. It has also been reported as a volcanic sublimate from fumarole deposits, as sulfide alteration products in black smokers. The mineral has also been found naturally on oxidized copper deposits in Chile, China, Russia, Czech Republic, Arizona, and Australia. It occurs in association with cuprite, brochantite, linarite, caledonite, malachite, chrysocolla and its polymorphs.

Synthetic Occurrence 
Atacamite has been discovered in the patina of the Statue of Liberty, and as alteration of ancient bronze and copper artifacts. The mineral has been found as a pigment in sculpture, manuscripts, maps, and frescoes discovered in Eurasia, Russia, and Persia.

Biomineral  
Atacamite occurs as a biomineral in the jaws of bloodworms.

References

External links
Mineral galleries

Copper(II) minerals
Halide minerals
Orthorhombic minerals
Minerals in space group 62
Minerals described in 1802